The United Arab Emirates women's under-19 cricket team represents the United Arab Emirates in international under-19 women's cricket. The team is administrated by the Emirates Cricket Board (ECB).

UAE qualified for the inaugural ICC Under-19 Women's T20 World Cup via winning the Asia Qualifier, going unbeaten in a five team tournament. The side reached the Super Six stage of the inaugural tournament.

History
The inaugural Women's Under-19 World Cup was scheduled to take place in January 2021, but was postponed multiple times due to the COVID-19 pandemic. The tournament was eventually scheduled to take place in 2023, in South Africa. UAE competed in the Asia Qualifier for the tournament in June 2022 in Malaysia. The side won all of their group matches, including a decisive six wicket victory over Thailand, to qualify for the tournament. 

UAE announced their squad for the tournament on 26 December 2022, with Najeeb Amar announced as Head Coach of the side. The side reached the Super Six stage, in which they finished bottom of their group.

Recent call-ups
The table below lists all the players who have been selected in recent squads for United Arab Emirates under-19s. Currently, this includes the squads for the 2022 Asia T20 World Cup Qualifier and the 2023 ICC Under-19 Women's T20 World Cup.

Records & statistics
International match summary

As of 25 January 2023

Youth Women's Twenty20 record versus other nations

As of 25 January 2023

Under-19 World Cup record

References

Women's Under-19 cricket teams
C
United Arab Emirates in international cricket